Tetragonoderus velutinus is a species of beetle in the family Carabidae. It was described by Victor Motschulsky in 1864.

References

Beetles described in 1864
velutinus